The Clemson Tigers women's college basketball team competes in the National Collegiate Athletic Association's (NCAA) Division I, representing Clemson University in the Atlantic Coast Conference.  Clemson has played its home games at Littlejohn Coliseum in Clemson, South Carolina since the team's inception in 1975.

Clemson started a women's basketball team during the 1975–76 season. They spent two years as an independent before the Atlantic Coast Conference began sponsoring the sport in 1977–78.  The Tigers have reached the final of the ACC tournament on five occasions, winning twice in 1996 and 1999.  Clemson received their first national postseason bid in 1980 to the National Women's Invitation Tournament (NWIT) and have participated in the tournament and its successor, the Women's National Invitation Tournament four times.  In 1982, the Tigers were invited to the inaugural NCAA tournament.  Their best NCAA showing to date was reaching the Elite Eight in 1991.

Seasons

Notes

References

 
Clemson Tigers
Clemson Tigers basketball seasons